The Klosterweg is a hiking trail in Rhineland-Palatinate, Germany.

Description

The trail was opened in May 2009. In October 2009 the Klosterweg received the quality label Premiumweg.

The Klosterweg leads along following sights:
  in Rengsdorf
 Evangelic church in Rengsdorf
 Römergraben (a medieval landwehr in Rengsdorf
 Spa park in Ehlscheid
 Church Heilige Schutzengel in Kurtscheid
 Mutter Rosa monument
 Fockenbach valley
 Church Maria Himmelfahrt in Waldbreitbach

References

External links
Website Klosterweg (in German)
Klosterweg leaflet (in German)

Hiking trails in Rhineland-Palatinate